Ewan Grandison (born 28 January 1991) is a Jamaican international footballer who plays for Memphis 901, as a midfielder.

Career
Grandison has played club football for Portmore United. Grandison scored crucial goals for Portmore United during their RSPL title winning campaign. In the 2016-2017 Red Stripe Premier League competition he has scored 8 goals in the league.

On 10 December 2018, Grandison signed with USL Championship side Memphis 901 FC ahead of their inaugural 2019 season.

International career 
After playing for Jamaica youth national teams, he made his senior international debut for Jamaica in 2012.
He was recently recalled by new coach Theodore Withmore and played in the Caribbean Cup qualifiers against Guyana and Suriname. He played in the friendly games versus the USA on 3 February and Honduras on 16 February 2017.

Honours 
Portmore United
 Winner of Jamaica National Premier League in 2012 and 2018

References

1991 births
Living people
Jamaican footballers
Jamaica international footballers
National Premier League players
Portmore United F.C. players
Memphis 901 FC players
USL Championship players
2017 CONCACAF Gold Cup players
Association football midfielders
Central F.C. players
Jamaican expatriate footballers
Jamaican expatriate sportspeople in Trinidad and Tobago
Expatriate footballers in Trinidad and Tobago
TT Pro League players
Jamaican expatriate sportspeople in the United States
Expatriate soccer players in the United States
People from Clarendon Parish, Jamaica